{{Speciesbox
|image = Zosterops japonicus, Cibodas Botanical Gardens, Java.jpg
|image_caption = Indian white-eye in a wild Himalayan cherry
|parent = Prunus subg. Cerasus
|taxon = Prunus cerasoides
|status = LC
|status_system = IUCN3.1
|status_ref = 
|authority = D.Don
|synonyms =  
Cerasus carmesina (H.Hara) H.Ohba
Cerasus cerasoides (Buch.-Ham. ex D. Don) S.Y. Sokolov
Cerasus majestica (Koehne) H.Ohba
Cerasus pectinata Spach
Cerasus phoshia Buch.-Ham. ex D.Don
Cerasus puddum Roxb. ex DC.
Cerasus puddum Ser.
Cerasus puddum Wall.
Maddenia pedicellata Hook.fil.
Microcerasus pectinata M.Roem.
Microcerasus phoshia M.Roem.
Prunus carmesina Hara
Prunus hosseusii Diels
Prunus majestica Koehne
Prunus pectinata Walp.Prunus puddum Franch.Prunus silvatica Roxb.Prunus sylvatica Hook.fil.

|synonyms_ref = 
}}Prunus cerasoides, commonly known as the wild Himalayan cherry or sour cherry, is a species of deciduous cherry tree in the family Rosaceae. It is found in southern and eastern Asia.

Its range extends in the Himalayas from Himachal Pradesh in north-central India, to south-western China, Burma and Thailand.

It has glossy, ringed bark. When the tree is not in flower, it is characterised by glossy, ringed bark and long, dentate stipules.

The tree flowers in autumn and winter. Flowers are hermaphroditic and are pinkish white in color. It has ovoid yellow fruit that turns red as it ripens.

Uses
CultivationPrunus cerasoides is cultivated as an ornamental tree. The tree thrives in well-drained and moisture-retentive loamy soil, in an open, sunny, and sheltered location.P. cerasoides, like most members of the genus Prunus'', is shallow rooted and is likely to produce suckers if the root is damaged.  It is likely to become chlorotic if too much lime is present. It is known to be susceptible to honey fungus.

The seed requires two to three months cold stratification and is best sown in a cold frame as early in winter as possible. The seed grows rather slowly and can sometimes take about 18 months to germinate depending on the conditions.

Food
Fruit — 15mm in diameter, the fruit can be eaten raw or cooked.
Gum — Gum is chewed and obtained from the trunk. It can be employed as a substitute for gum tragacanth.
Seed — It can be eaten raw or cooked.

Other uses
The fruits and the leaves give a dark green dye. Seeds can be used in the manufacture of necklaces.

The wood is hard, strong, durable and aromatic, and branches are used as walking sticks.

References

External links
 
 

cerasoides
Cherries
Sour fruits
Trees of China
Flora of the Indian subcontinent
Flora of Indo-China
Garden plants of Asia
Ornamental trees
Plants described in 1825